

References 

Additional references
 
 

S